The American University of Europe - FON (AUE - FON) is a private university with headquarters in Skopje, North Macedonia. It is the second private university established in North Macedonia after the liberalization of the High education law's in 2002. After its establishment great number of professors from the Ss. Cyril and Methodius University in Skopje transferred to the new university and contributed to building a better educational system in the Republic of Macedonia.

AUE - FON University is an autonomous, private, non-profit, scientific, and higher education institution, established in the year of 2003 as a Faculty of Social Sciences. The founder of the first private university in the country is Mr. Fiat Canoski, MA. In 2007, with the introduction of new academic areas, the institution became the First Private University-FON. As a result of the significant growth in its development and the great interest for education, apart from Skopje, FON-University opens three dispensary departments in Strumica, Gostivar and Struga. Still functioning to this day is the dispensary department in Struga.

Following the world trends in higher education in order to adapt to the interest, needs and requirements of students, in 2020 the university rebranded and renamed itself into the American University of Europe-FON.

For the past 19 years of its existence, the University has been constantly investing in its growth and advancement, because we are aware that investments in education drive innovation, create new values and are a key tool for transformation.

Thus, with the continuous investments today, the American University of Europe-FON sets world standards and conditions for the academic development of each individual, stimulates competition and contributes to the shaping of the employment market.

As a leading higher education institution in private education, the American University of Europe-FON, has faculties that offer teaching of higher education in the first and second cycle of studies, and will soon begin with a third cycle of studies, which allows students to be educated by the best academic teaching staff from the country and abroad.

In addition, the University combines knowledge and experience, research and practice, and the multidisciplinary approach we apply has a strategic role in meeting the needs of entrepreneurship and adapting students to the changes the world is facing today.

Since its establishment to this day, more than 9000 students have completed their higher education at the first and second cycle of studies at our university, which is a number of respect and proof of the realization of the university efforts to provide knowledge verified with diplomas that are equally valued abroad as well as in the country.

Faculties
The University has 5 faculties:
 Faculty of Law and Political Science
 Faculty of Economics
 Faculty for Detectives and Security
 Faculty of Information and Communication Technology
 Faculty of Design and Multimedia

Student life
The University has an active student body, which is synchronizing the extra CV activities of the students, organises projects, finds internship for the students, does evaluation of the studies and giving suggestions for their advancement. Organizes student competitions and sports activities, social events and happenings. The student's association publishes a magazine involving all students with journalistic affinities and dealing with issues that concern and interest the students. The students' association also collaborates with the Center for Development and Careers to realize a part of its activities.

See also
 Balkan Universities Network
 List of universities in North Macedonia
 Skopje

References

External links 
 

Universities in North Macedonia
Educational institutions established in 2003
Education in Skopje
2003 establishments in the Republic of Macedonia
Struga